Aleste 2 (アレスタ２) is a scrolling shooter video game developed and released by Compile for the MSX2 in 1989 exclusively in Japan. It is a sequel to Aleste and is the first game in the Aleste series to feature the recurring series heroine Ellinor who later appeared in Musha Aleste. Aleste 2, along with other Compile shooters, was also released for the now-defunct WOOMB service. In 2009, ProjectEGG released the game digitally for Windows, also in English.

Gameplay

Plot
The game takes place in the year 2039, two decades after the supercomputer DIA 51 attacked and decimated the Earth. After the long restoration period, Earth is invaded by a race of alien plantlike humanoids called the Vagand, intent on finding a new food source on Earth. In their first attack on Earth, the Vagand destroy an Earth space cruiser commanded by the previous Earth hero, Ray Waizen. Their plan to invade Earth is challenged by the newest version of the Aleste piloted by the daughter of Ray and Yuri Waizen, Ellinor, who has vowed to avenge her father's death and to personally kill the Vagand leader Gaizel.

Development and release
Former Compile members Yuichi Toyama and Kazuyuki Nakashima stated that a prototype of Aleste 2 for Sega Mega Drive was developed but it was ultimately reworked into MUSHA.

Reception

Retro Gamer included it among top ten MSX games. While the three Aleste titles for the MSX computers "all are worth seeking out", they chose Aleste 2 "because it looks superb, allows you to select your weapons at the start of the game, and is the first title in the canon to feature reoccurring protagonist Ellinor".

Adaptation
Aleste 2 was adapted into a manga on January 8, 1990 in Japan and it is part of the Compile Club series.

References

External links
Aleste 2 at MobyGames
Aleste 2 at Hardcore Gaming 101

1989 video games
Cancelled Sega Genesis games
Compile (company) games
MSX2 games
Science fiction video games
Single-player video games
Video games developed in Japan
Video games featuring female protagonists
Video games scored by Toshiaki Sakoda
Video game sequels
Vertically scrolling shooters
Windows games
Video games set in the 2030s